The San Juan National High School (SJNHS) (Filipino: Pambansang Mataas na Paaralan ng San Juan) is a public secondary school in the Municipality of Kalayaan. Located in Real St., Brgy. San Juan, the poblacion, it provides free secondary education for the people of the municipality and neighboring towns with primary aim on secondary basic education.

History

San Juan National High School was first known as San Juan Community High School, established in 1968. It had a total population of 105 first-year students.

The name of the school was later changed into San Juan Barangay High School when Mr. Pedro Madrazo was elected as the PTA president.

Hon. Elpidio Asedillo, elected municipal mayor, together with the help of Barangay Captain Pastor Manguiat, improved the structure of the school. The supervision was direct from Pedro Guevara Memorial High School in Sta. Cruz, Laguna, although the assistant principal who at that time was the elementary school principal directly supervised the barangay high school since it shares a portion of San Juan Central School site.

In the 1980s, there was a need for the construction of new buildings. The first three-room building near the town's medical center was erected. It housed the school's bulging population and paved way for the whole population to transfer to the new school site. The town's gymnasium was temporarily converted into classrooms.

The school was nationalized and its name changed into San Juan National High School. More buildings were built including the Gov. Teresita S. Lazaro-type two-storey, four-classroom building, while modern science laboratory apparatuses, PC units in the computer laboratory and other teaching aids were given to the school.

Beginning in the year 2003, two extension schools were opened in Brgy. Later on, SJNHS – Paete Extension was nationalized and renamed Poten and Eliceo M. Quesada Memorial National High School, where Mr. Byrd became head teacher.

In 2010, the Gov. ER Ejercito-type two-storey, four-classroom building was built. In 2013, additional two-storey, six-classroom public private partnership (PPP)-type building was constructed in the lower portion of the school site.

Past and present administrators

Miss Aurora Lagrada, Principal - 1968-1970
Mr. Enrique Javan, Assistant Principal - 1970-1974
Miss Eustaquia Oben, Assistant Principal - 1974-1978
Mrs. Myrna Kabamalan, Assistant Principal - 1978-1986
Mrs. Estela P. Salandanan, Head Teacher - 1986-1992
Mrs. Marietta R. Rabutazo, Head Teacher / Principal - 1992-1999
Dr. Sonia S. Cadawas, Principal II - 1999-2005
Dr. Estela P. Salandanan, Principal III - 2005-May 2010
Mrs. Redelia P. Vista, EPS I - Science / OIC - May–August 2010
Mr. Solomon B. Kahulugan, Principal III - August 2010 - September 2011
Ms. Norma I. Tablico, Principal III - September 2011-December 2012
Dr. Orlando T. Valverde, EPS I - ALS / OIC - January–August 2, 2013
Mrs. Ma. Nelia A. Valero, Principal III - August 5, 2013 – September 15, 2014
Dr. Socorro R. Fundivilla, Principal IV - September 19, 2014 – July 3, 2020
Dr. Reynaldo D. Villaluz, Principal IV - July 4, 2020 – present

Curriculum
San Juan National High School implements the Basic Education Curriculum (BEC) as prescribed by the Department of Education of the Philippines.

References 

High schools in Laguna (province)